Miguel Martínez (born February 15, 1991, in Guasave, Sinaloa, Mexico), is a Mexican actor and singer.

Filmography

Discography 
La chica de mis sueños (2004)

Awards and nominations

References

External links 

1991 births
Living people
Mexican male telenovela actors
Male actors from Sinaloa
Singers from Sinaloa
People from Guasave
21st-century Mexican male actors
21st-century Mexican singers